Epibactra is a genus of moths belonging to the subfamily Olethreutinae of the family Tortricidae.

Species
Epibactra sareptana (Herrich-Schffer, 1861)
Epibactra usuiana Kawabe, 1976

See also
List of Tortricidae genera

References

External links
tortricidae.com

Tortricidae genera
Olethreutinae